Tarek Salman Suleiman Odeh (born 5 December 1997) is a Qatari footballer who plays as a midfielder for Qatari Club side Al Sadd and the Qatar national team.

Career
Tarek started off his youth career in his home-city; Al Wakrah, Al-Wakrah SC. In which he led the 1997 team as a striker. Later on, he joined Aspire Academy in the 2008–09 season and excelled as defender. During his youth career, he played in Qatar for Lekhwiya. He later trained in Spain with Deportivo Alavés as well as Real Sociedad C in his youth years.

In November 2016, Salman started his senior career, joining Spanish side Cultural Leonesa. He joined Tercera División club Atlético Astorga in 2017. He featured in a league match against Almazán on 23 September 2017 which ended in a 1–1 draw.

International career
He appeared in one match for Qatar's youth team in the 2015 FIFA U-20 World Cup.

Honours

Club
Al-Sadd
 Qatar Stars League: 2018–19, 2020-21, 2021-22
 Qatar Cup: 2020, 2021
 Emir of Qatar Cup: 2020 Emir of Qatar Cup, 2021 Emir of Qatar Cup
 Qatari Stars Cup: 2019-20 Qatari Stars Cup

International
Qatar
AFC Asian Cup: 2019

References

External links
 
 
 

1997 births
Living people
Qatari footballers
Association football midfielders
Al-Wakrah SC players
Lekhwiya SC players
Aspire Academy (Qatar) players
Al Sadd SC players
Tercera División players
Qatar Stars League players
Cultural Leonesa footballers
Atlético Astorga FC players
Footballers at the 2018 Asian Games
2019 AFC Asian Cup players
AFC Asian Cup-winning players
Asian Games competitors for Qatar
2019 Copa América players
2021 CONCACAF Gold Cup players
Qatari expatriate footballers
Expatriate footballers in Spain
Qatari expatriate sportspeople in Spain
Qatar international footballers
Qatar youth international footballers
Qatar under-20 international footballers
2022 FIFA World Cup players